Finley Stadium may refer to:

Carter–Finley Stadium, located at North Carolina State University
W. Max Finley Stadium, located at University of Tennessee at Chattanooga
Ron Finley Stadium, located at Campbellsville University